Bruce William Outtram (born 7 September 1949) is a former Australian rules footballer who played with Collingwood in the Victorian Football League (VFL).

Notes

External links 

1949 births
Australian rules footballers from Victoria (Australia)
Collingwood Football Club players
Casterton Football Club players
Living people